The 1954–55 Illinois Fighting Illini men’s basketball team represented the University of Illinois.

Regular season
Head coach Harry Combes, in his eighth year at Illinois, directed a youthful team with only three returning seniors, none of which were regular players.  Combes' team, once again, was primarily made of sophomores and juniors recruited from the state of Illinois.

The 1954-55 team had some talented juniors including the return of twin brothers, Paul and Phil Judson from Hebron, Illinois, Bruce Brothers and Bill Ridley.  It also added sophomores George Bon Salle, Bill Altenberger, Hiles Stout, and future Illini head coach, Harv Schmidt. Exactly like the previous season, the Illini finished with a conference record of 10 wins and 4 losses, finishing in a 2nd place tie in the Big Ten. Unfortunately the Illini would lose 5 total games with three of the five losses coming at the hands of ranked opponents.  The starting lineup included George Bon Salle at the center position, Bill Ridley and Bill Altenberger at guard and Bruce Brothers and Paul Judson at the forward slots.

Roster

Source

Schedule
												
Source																
												

|-
!colspan=12 style="background:#DF4E38; color:white;"| Non-Conference regular season

|-
!colspan=9 style="background:#DF4E38; color:#FFFFFF;"|Big Ten regular season

|-					

Bold Italic connotes conference game

Player stats

Awards and honors
Paul Judson
International News Service Honorable Mention All-American
Converse Honorable Mention All-American
Team Most Valuable Player 
Bill Ridley
Associated Press Honorable Mention All-American
Converse Honorable Mention All-American
George Bon Salle
Converse Honorable Mention All-American

Team players drafted into the NBA

Rankings

References

Illinois Fighting Illini
Illinois Fighting Illini men's basketball seasons
1954 in sports in Illinois
1955 in sports in Illinois